Hassaan Riaz is a Pakistani politician who was a Member of the Provincial Assembly of the Punjab, from October 2014 to May 2018.

Early life and education
He was born on 27 August 1989 in Sheikhupura.

He has a degree of Bachelor of Arts in Journalism which he obtained in 2012 from University of the Punjab.

Political career

He was elected to the Provincial Assembly of the Punjab as a candidate of Pakistan Muslim League (Nawaz) from Constituency PP-162 (Sheikhupura-I) in by-polls held in October 2014.

References

Living people
Punjab MPAs 2013–2018
1989 births
Pakistan Muslim League (N) politicians